The Ciurlac is a left tributary of the river Moldova in Romania. It flows into the Moldova in Cordun. For much of its length it flows parallel to the north of the Moldova.

References

Rivers of Romania
Rivers of Neamț County